The Phi Beta Kappa Society is the oldest academic honor society in the United States, and the most prestigious, due in part to its long history and academic selectivity. Phi Beta Kappa aims to promote and advocate excellence in the liberal arts and sciences, and to induct the most outstanding students of arts and sciences at only select American colleges and universities. It was founded at the College of William and Mary on December 5, 1776, as the first collegiate Greek-letter fraternity and was among the earliest collegiate fraternal societies. Since its inception, 17 U.S. presidents, 40 U.S. Supreme Court justices, and 136 Nobel laureates have been inducted members.

Membership
Phi Beta Kappa has chapters in only about 10% of American higher learning institutions, and only about 10% of these schools' Arts and Sciences graduates are invited to join. Although most students are elected in their senior year, many colleges elect a limited number of extremely select students in their junior year, generally less than 2% of the class. Each chapter sets its own academic standards, but all inductees must have studied the liberal arts and sciences, demonstrated "good moral character", and, usually, earned grades placing them in the top tenth of their class. However, at least one school, Princeton University, includes Bachelor of Science in Engineering (BSE) students in Phi Beta Kappa. There is a mandatory initiation fee (between $50 and $95, as of 2005), which is sometimes covered by the inductee's university.

Membership in Phi Beta Kappa is limited to undergraduates with very high GPAs, typically at least 3.8 out of a 4.0 scale. In 2001, a quorum of PBK alumni voted to raise the GPA cutoff: though all chapters set their standards for induction, they were now instructed to be much more selective in terms of GPA.

History

Origins

The Phi Beta Kappa Society had its first meeting on December 5, 1776, at the College of William and Mary in Williamsburg, Virginia by five students, with John Heath as its first President. The society established the precedent for naming American college societies after the initial letters of a secret Greek motto.

The group consisted of students who frequented the Raleigh Tavern as a common meeting area off the college campus. A persistent story maintains that a Masonic lodge also met at this tavern, but the Freemasons actually gathered at a different building in Williamsburg. (Some of the original members of Phi Beta Kappa did become Freemasons, but later in life).

Whether the students organized to meet more freely and discuss non-academic topics, or to discuss politics in a Revolutionary society is unknown. The earliest records indicate only that the students met to debate and engage in oratory, and on topics that would have been not far removed from the curriculum. In the Phi Beta Kappa Initiation of 1779, the new member was informed, "here then you may for a while disengage yourself from scholastic cares and communicate without reserve whatever reflections you have made upon various objects; remembering that every thing transacted within this room is transacted sub rosa, ...here, too, you are to indulge in matters of speculation that freedom of enquiry which ever dispels the clouds of falsehood by the radiant sunshine of truth...".

Latin letter fraternal societies
There had been an earlier fraternal society established at William & Mary, the F.H.C. Society (nicknamed "the Flat Hat Club"), which was founded in 1750. The F.H.C. Society is the first recorded collegiate secret society in North America, but unlike Phi Beta Kappa, it was a Latin-letter society. Its name was taken from letters of a secret Latin motto with acronym F.H.C.

A second Latin-letter fraternity at William & Mary was the P.D.A. Society (publicly known as "Please Don't Ask").  John Heath, chief organizer of Phi Beta Kappa, according to tradition earlier sought but was refused admission to the P.D.A., though he may instead have disdained to join it. Heath's friend and fellow student William Short later wrote that the P.D.A. "had lost all reputation for letters, and was noted only for the dissipation & conviviality of its members".

Secret fraternal society

The new society was intended to be "purely of domestic manufacture, without any connection whatever with anything European, either English or German."  The founders of Phi Beta Kappa declared that the society was formed for congeniality and to promote good fellowship, with "friendship as its basis and benevolence and literature as its pillars."

Like the older, Latin-letter fraternities, the Phi Beta Kappa was a secret society. To protect its members and to instill a sense of solidarity, each had the essential attributes of most modern fraternities: an oath of secrecy, a badge (or token) and a diploma (or certificate) of membership, mottoes (in the case of the Phi Beta Kappa, in Greek rather than in Latin), a ritual of initiation, a handclasp of recognition; to these, the Phi Beta Kappa would soon add another attribute, branches or "chapters" at other colleges. The new society was given the motto,  or in Latin letters , which means in English Love of learning is the guide of life. Greek was chosen, because Greek was in Roman times the language of science like Latin in medieval times.

Later, in May 1777, a new sign of recognition was devised: "a salutation of the clasp of the hands, together with an immediate stroke across the mouth with the back of the same hand, and a return with the hand used by the saluted". This new complex of gestures was created to allow the mutual recognition of members "in any foreign country or place."

Before the British attempt at reclamation of the sovereign American colonies, including Virginia, there was a temporary closure of the College of William and Mary and disbandment of Phi Beta Kappa in early 1781. Elisha Parmelee, an alumnus of Yale College and Harvard College, passed through Williamsburg and took charters from the Phi Beta Kappa to establish branches of the society at these schools. A second chapter was founded at Yale College in late 1780; a third, at Harvard College in 1781; and a fourth, at Dartmouth College in 1787.

Transition to academic honor society
Further chapters appeared at Union College in 1817, Bowdoin College in 1825, and Brown University in 1830. The original chapter at William & Mary was re-established. In 1831, the Harvard chapter publicly disclosed the fraternity's secrets during a period of strong anti-Masonic sentiment. The first chapter established after Phi Beta Kappa became an "open" society was that at Trinity College (Connecticut), in 1845.

In the pre-Civil War period, Society chapters frequently sponsored addresses by distinguished speakers. Ralph Waldo Emerson's 1837 address at Harvard, "The American Scholar", is the best-known of those addresses, but there were dozens of others at schools such as Bowdoin, Brown, Harvard, Union, and Yale.

As the first collegiate organization of its type to adopt a Greek-letter name, the Phi Beta Kappa is generally considered a forerunner of modern college fraternities as well as the model for later collegiate honorary societies. Ironically, it was partly the rise of true "social" fraternities modelled after Phi Beta Kappa later in the nineteenth century which obviated the social aspects of membership in the organization, transforming it into the honorary society it is today.

By 1883, when the United Chapters of Phi Beta Kappa was established, there were 25 chapters. The first women were elected to the Society at the University of Vermont in 1875, and the first African-American member, George Washington Henderson, was elected at the same institution two years later. In 1885, however, Phi Beta Kappa eliminated those majoring in engineering from eligibility. This practice continues today.

Each chapter is designated by its state and a Greek letter indicating its position in the order in which that state's chapters were founded. For example, Alpha of Pennsylvania refers to the chapter at Dickinson College, founded in 1887; Beta of Pennsylvania, the chapter at Lehigh University (founded later that same year); Gamma of Pennsylvania, the chapter at Lafayette College (1890); and Delta of Pennsylvania, the chapter at the University of Pennsylvania (1892).

By 1920, a total of 89 chapters existed at a variety of schools.

Its participation was short lived, with the decision to withdraw and operate again as an independent society made just over a decade later, effective .

In the 1960s, Vanderbilt University professor Donald Davidson claimed that Phi Beta Kappa was under the influence of Communists.

In 1988, the United Chapters of Phi Beta Kappa officially changed its name to The Phi Beta Kappa Society, recalling the name under which the organization had been established in 1776.

Today, Phi Beta Kappa participates in a more loosely coordinated lobbying association of four of the nation's oldest and most prestigious honor societies, called the Honor Society Caucus. Its members include Phi Beta Kappa, Phi Kappa Phi, Sigma Xi, and Omicron Delta Kappa.

Key

The symbol of the Phi Beta Kappa Society is a golden key engraved on the obverse with the image of a pointing finger, three stars, and the Greek letters from which the society takes its name. On the reverse are found the initials "SP" in script. One official historian of the society, William T. Hastings, and some others believe that the "S" and "P", which stood for Societas Philosophiae, "Philosophical Society", was the original name of the Society and that "Phi Beta Kappa" came only over time to be taken as the name of the society.  The heading on the original list of members states, "A List of the members, who have been initiated into the S.P. alias Phi Beta Kappa Society."

The "key" of Phi Beta Kappa did not begin as a copy of a watchkey. The first insignia was in fact a larger, cut-and-engraved silver medallion, essentially a square of metal with a loop cut integrally with the body of the square from the same sheet of silver, in order to allow for suspension from one or two ribbons worn around the member's neck in the manner in which the older fraternities (and the Masonic bodies on which the collegiate societies were in part patterned) wore their own insignia.  Later, the size of the medallion was reduced and men took to wearing the insignia on their watch chains as fobs.

Though several stylistic details have survived since the earliest days—the use of the stars, pointing hand, and Greek letters on the obverse, for example—notable differences exist between older keys and current examples.  The name of the recipient was not engraved on the earliest fobs or keys, and was not until the first decade of the nineteenth century.  The name of the school from which the fob or key came was also not routinely included on the earliest models, and sometimes the only way to trace a key to a particular school's chapter is by researching the name of the recipient against surviving class records.  The number of stars on the obverse has also changed over the years, with never fewer than three, but on some known examples with as many as a dozen (the explanation as to the meaning of the stars in these early cases varies from chapter to chapter).  Also, the date of the awarding of the honor is only seen on keys from the second quarter of the nineteenth century onward (some people mistake the date that appears on the fob or key—December 5, 1776—as the date that a particular fob or key was awarded, when in fact it is merely the date of the founding of the society).  Only in 1912 was the key made to a uniform standard of size, golden appearance (some are plated), and engraving with the school's name, recipient's name, and date of the award.

Activities and publications
The Phi Beta Kappa Society publishes The Key Reporter, a newsletter distributed quarterly to all contributing members and biannually to all other members, and The American Scholar, a quarterly subscription-based journal that accepts essays on literature, history, science, public affairs, and culture.

Phi Beta Kappa also funds a number of awards, fellowships, and programs.

The Phi Beta Kappa Book Awards are the Ralph Waldo Emerson Award, the Christian Gauss Award (named for Christian Gauss), and the Phi Beta Kappa Award in Science. The Book Awards are given annually to outstanding scholarly books published in the United States.  Winning works, which are drawn from the fields of the humanities, the social sciences, the natural sciences and mathematics, must be of broad interest and accessible to the general reader. Each award carries a $10,000 prize.  The winners were selected from five short listed titles in each category.

The Mary Isabel Sibley Fellowship is awarded annually, alternating in the fields of Greek and French. The award may be used for the study of Greek language, literature, history, or archaeology, or the study of French language or literature. Established in 1934 by Isabelle Stone (ΦΒΚ, Wellesley College) in honor of her mother, Mary Isabel Sibley, the fellowship was designed to reward the women in these two fields of study with the experience of studying and living abroad, which Miss Stone did in Greece during her studies. The fellowship carries a stipend of $20,000.

The Walter J. Jensen Fellowship for French Language, Literature, and Culture aims to help educators and researchers improve education in standard French language, literature and culture and in the study of standard French in the United States. Established in 2001 by Professor Walter J. Jensen (ΦΒΚ, UCLA), the fellowship is awarded for at least six continuous months of study in France and carries a stipend originally set in 1995 at $10,000, to be adjusted for inflation. The stipend for 2016 was $15,500.

The Dr. Martin R. Lebowitz and Eve Lewellis Lebowitz Prize for Philosophical Achievement and Contribution is awarded by the Phi Beta Kappa Society in conjunction with the American Philosophical Association. The associated Lebowitz Symposium is presented annually at a divisional meeting of the American Philosophical Association. The prize was established in 2013 by Eve Lewellis Lebowitz in honor of her late husband, Martin R. Lebowitz, to provide a significant, tangible recognition for excellence in philosophical thought. The Symposium program consists of a pair of lectures to be delivered at an annual APA division meeting and a Phi Beta Kappa event. The topic of the lectures should be an important philosophical issue of current interest, and the lectures should offer contrasting (not necessarily opposing) views on that topic. Honoraria for the symposiasts are funded at an adjusted rate based on the current size of the endowment. Previous winners have won as much as $25,000 each.

The Romanell-Phi Beta Kappa Professorship is awarded annually to scholars in the field of philosophy, without restriction to any one school of philosophical thought. The professorship recognizes not only distinguished achievement but also the recipient's contribution or potential contribution to public understanding of philosophy.

Since 1956, the Phi Beta Kappa Visiting Scholar Program has offered undergraduates the opportunity to spend time with some of America's most distinguished scholars. The purpose of the program is to contribute to the intellectual life of the campus by making possible an exchange of ideas between the Visiting Scholars and the resident faculty and students.

Phi Beta Kappa also sponsors a National Arts & Sciences Initiative, which taps into its cross-country network of members, chapters, and associations to connect with leaders, shares the value of the arts and sciences through all of life, and advocates for policies that strengthen an arts and sciences education.

Chapters

Phi Beta Kappa has 293 chapters. Chapters are approved at the Triennial Conventions.

Notable members

Since its inception, 17 U.S. Presidents, 42 U.S. Supreme Court Justices, and more than 150 Nobel Laureates have been inducted members.

Awards 
In 2008, the Phi Beta Kappa Society was awarded the Arts and Sciences Advocacy Award from the Council of Colleges of Arts and Sciences (CCAS). CCAS bestows this award upon an individual or organization demonstrating exemplary advocacy for the arts and sciences, flowing from a deep commitment to the intrinsic worth of liberal arts education.

See also
 Phi Beta Kappa Award in Science
 Phi Kappa Phi
 Phi Theta Kappa

References

External links
 
 

1776 establishments in Virginia
College of William & Mary student life
Organizations established in 1776
Student organizations established in the 18th century
Honor societies
Former members of Association of College Honor Societies